This was the first edition of the tournament.

Facundo Bagnis won the title after defeating Facundo Mena 6–3, 6–0 in the final.

Seeds

Draw

Finals

Top half

Bottom half

References

External links
Main draw
Qualifying draw

Pereira Challenger - 1